The Örgryte Old Church is a church building in Örgryte in Gothenburg, Sweden. Belonging to the Örgryte Parish of the Church of Sweden, a church at the present site where the Örgryte Old Church is today has been around since the 13th century.

References

External links

Churches in Gothenburg
Churches in the Diocese of Gothenburg
Churches converted from the Roman Catholic Church to the Church of Sweden